Brigadier Neil Mackenzie Freeman,  (21 April 1890 – 7 November 1961) was a senior officer of the Australian Army and an Australian rules footballer who played with Geelong in the Victorian Football League (VFL).

After a four-year senior football career, he served in the infantry during the First World War, rising to the rank of major within the First Australian Imperial Force and receiving the Distinguished Service Order in November 1917 for actions during the Battle of Polygon Wood, serving with the 58th Battalion and then the 31st, both of which he commanded briefly. He was awarded a Distinguished Service Order for "gallant services in the Battle of Polygon Wood" in 1917 and was Mentioned in Despatches.

After discharge from the service, he returned to his city of birth – Geelong – to work as a councillor, standing for election to the Australian Parliament.  He became a solicitor, holding a law degree from Melbourne University, and worked for a law firm before setting up his own practice.

Following the outbreak of World War II, Freeman returned to the armed forces and rose to the rank of brigadier. He was discharged from the Army on 3 July 1943; his last posting was to the 3rd Military District's infantry training brigade.

Notes

External links 

1890 births
1961 deaths
Military personnel from Victoria (Australia)
Australian rules footballers from Geelong
Australian military personnel of World War I
Australian Army personnel of World War II
Australian solicitors
University of Melbourne alumni
Australian brigadiers
Australian Companions of the Distinguished Service Order
Australian rules footballers from Victoria (Australia)
Geelong Football Club players
East Geelong Football Club players
People educated at Geelong College